The 2013–14 Phoenix Coyotes season was the franchise's 35th season in the National Hockey League (NHL), the 18th in Arizona and the 42nd overall, including the seasons the franchise played in the World Hockey Association. The Coyotes finished the season situated ninth in the Western Conference, missing the Stanley Cup playoffs for the second consecutive year.

This was the team's final season as the "Phoenix Coyotes" - as part of the deal approved by the City of Glendale to keep the team in the city on July 2, the franchise had agreed to change its name from the Phoenix Coyotes to the Arizona Coyotes for the 2014–15 season.

As a result of realignment, this was the first season in which the franchise had the Calgary Flames, Edmonton Oilers and Vancouver Canucks as division rivals since the 1992–93 season, when the team was still known as the Winnipeg Jets and the Pacific Division was called the Smythe Division. During that era (in which the top four teams in each division made the playoffs and played each other in the first two rounds), the Jets had intense rivalries with the Flames, Oilers and Canucks.

Off-season
After years of relocation rumors and speculation, the Coyotes were sold to IceArizona AcquisitionCo., LLC on August 5, 2013, keeping the Coyotes in Glendale, Arizona.

Standings

Schedule and results

Pre-season

Regular season

Playoffs
For the second consecutive year, the Coyotes failed to make the playoffs.

Player statistics
Final Stats
Skaters

Goaltenders

†Denotes player spent time with another team before joining the Coyotes.  Stats reflect time with the Coyotes only.
‡Traded mid-season
Bold/italics denotes franchise record

Transactions 
The Coyotes have been involved in the following transactions during the 2013–14 season.

Trades

Free agents acquired

Free agents lost

Player signings

Draft picks

Phoenix Coyotes' picks at the 2013 NHL Entry Draft, that was held in Newark, New Jersey on June 30, 2013.

Draft notes
 The New Jersey Devils' second-round pick went to the Phoenix Coyotes as the result of a trade on June 30, 2013, that sent second and third-round picks in 2013 (42nd and 73rd overall) to New Jersey in exchange for this pick.
 The Florida Panthers' third-round pick went to the Phoenix Coyotes (via NY Rangers and San Jose) as a result of an April 3, 2013, trade that sent Raffi Torres to the Sharks in exchange for this pick.
 The Phoenix Coyotes' fourth-round pick went to the Los Angeles Kings (via Columbus and Philadelphia), Phoenix traded this pick to the Columbus Blue Jackets as the result of a February 22, 2012, trade that sent Antoine Vermette to the Coyotes in exchange for Curtis McElhinney, a 2012 second-round pick and this pick.

References

Arizona Coyotes seasons
Phoenix Coyotes season, 2013-14
Phoenix